Bacchus was launched in 1775 at Bristol, almost surely under another name. She first appeared in online records as Bacchus in 1786, sailing as a West Indiaman. From 1799 to 1807 she was a slave ship in the triangular trade in enslaved people. She was condemned in 1807 at Trinidad after she had delivered the slaves she had gathered on her fifth slave voyage.

Career
Bacchus entered Lloyd's Register (LR), in 1786. The issue of Lloyd's Register for 1785 is not available on line, so there is no clear indication of what her name was before Samuel Span purchased her.

1st slave trading voyage (1799–1800): Captain John Ford acquired a letter of marque on 17 July 1799. He sailed from Bristol on 7 September. He acquired slaves at Calabar. Bacchus touched at Barbados before arriving at Montego Bay, Jamaica on 27 April 1800. Ford died before she reached Barbados; he had died on 19 November 1799, on his third journey as captain of a slave ship. James Lea replaced Ford as master on Bacchus. She sailed from Jamaica on 20 July and arrived at Liverpool on 29 September. She had left Bristol with 53 crew members and she suffered 22 crew deaths on her voyage.

2nd slave voyage (1803–1804): Bacchus sailed from Liverpool on 7 March 1803. Captain Alexander Nicholson acquired a letter of marque on 2 August. Bacchus acquired slaves at Angola and touched at Barbados. She arrived at Demerara on 8 October 1803 with 280 slaves. She sailed from Demerara on 2 December and arrived back at Liverpool on 24 January 1804. She had left Liverpool with 36 crew members and she had no crew deaths on her voyage.

Between March and September 1804 Nicholson sailed  to the West Indies and back.

3rd slave voyage (1804–1805): Captain Richard Hughes sailed from Liverpool on 29 April 1804. He acquired slaves at Old Calabar and arrived at Kingston on 28 January 1805 with 277 slaves. Bacchus sailed from Kingston on 21 April and arrived back at Liverpool on 6 July. She had left Liverpool with 43 crew members and had suffered six crew deaths on her voyage.

4th slave voyage (1805–1806): Captain Alexander Nicholson sailed from Liverpool on 27 September 1805. He acquired slaves at Accra and Anomabu, where she was reported on 26 March, but died on 2 May 1806, shortly before Bacchus sailed from Africa on 28 May with Eliot Arthy as master. She arrived at Suriname on 16 July, and sailed for Liverpool on 7 November. She arrived at Liverpool on 17 January 1807. She had left Liverpool with 48 crew members and had suffered four crew deaths on her voyage. She brought back with here sugar, cotton, camwood, and ivory.

5th slave voyage (1807–sale): Captain Thomas Houghton sailed from Liverpool on 30 April 1807. He acquired slaves at Calabar and arrived at Trinidad and Tobago on  21 December 1807. She had left Liverpool with 41 crew members and had suffered eight crew deaths on her voyage.

Fate
The database on the trans-Atlantic slave trade reports that Bacchus was condemned at Trinidad. The last mention of her with Houghton, master, reported that she had arrived at Trinidad and was selling. The registers continued to carry her for several years with stale data, but she did not appear in ship arrival and departure data in the press.

Citations

References
 
 

1775 ships
Ships built in Bristol
Age of Sail merchant ships of England
Bristol slave ships
Liverpool slave ships